The Korea Communications Standards Commission is an institution of the South Korean government that regulates communications including film, television, radio, and internet.

At its formation in 2008, the KCSC replaced an earlier body, the Information and Communication Ethics Committee.

In September 2011, the KCSC decided to open up its three discussion committees to the public.

TV program ratings 

The South Korean television rating system has been in force since 2000, and it started with only four classifications which are All, 7, 13 and 18. In February 2001, all programs except domestic dramas (which had been enforced since November 2002) are required to have a rating system. In 2007, rating 13 was changed into 12 and a new rating, 15 is introduced. Most programs have to be rated, except the "exempt" rating below. Even if it qualifies for being exempt, a broadcaster may apply a rating.

   All (모든 연령 시청가, Mo-deun yeon-ryeong si-cheong-ga): This rating is for programming that is appropriate for all ages. Television programs with this rating may contain some violence and/or some mild language. No adult content is allowed.
  7 (7세 이상 시청가, chil-se ii-sang si-cheong-ga): Children under 7 are prohibited from watching this program/film. Children aged 7–8 may watch this program/film, but must be accompanied by an adult. Television programs with this rating can contain mild violence, mild language and few romance.
  12 (12세 이상 시청가, sib-i-se i-sang si-cheong-ga): Children under 12 are prohibited from watching this program/film. Television programs with this rating may contain horror, some fantasy violence, some sexual content, little use of strong language, mild blood, and/or mild suggestive themes.
  15 (15세 이상 시청가, sib-o-se i-sang si-cheong-ga): Children under 15 are prohibited from watching this program/film. TV shows with this rating may contain use of alcohol, more sexual content, mild violence or little strong violence, major blood or gore, and/or suggestive themes.
  19 (19세 이상 시청가, sip-gu-se i-sang si-cheong-ga): Children under 19 are prohibited from watching this program/film. 19-rated programming is banned from airing during the hours of 7:00AM to 9:00AM, and 1:00PM to 10:00PM. Programs that receive this rating will almost certainly have adult themes, sexual situations, strong language and disturbing scenes of violence.
 Exempt (no icon or name): This rating is only for knowledge based game shows; lifestyle shows; documentary shows; news; current topic discussion shows; education/culture shows; sports that excludes MMA or other violent sports; and other programs that the Korea Communications Standards Commission recognizes. Disclaimer or rating icons are not needed.

Rating icons may be transparent, and can be positioned either on the upper-left or upper-right corner of the screen. The icon has a size of at least 1/20 of the screen, and has black writing on a yellow circle with a white outline. These icons are shown for 30 seconds when the program starts, and are shown again every 10 minutes, and when the program resumes after commercial breaks. This does not apply to 19-rated programs, where the icon must be visible throughout the entire program.
These regulations do not apply to the "All" rating, as it does not have an icon.
A rating disclaimer is displayed on the start of the program for five seconds explaining "This program is prohibited for children under the age of X, so parental accompaniment is required"(이 프로그램은 X세 미만의 어린이/청소년이 시청하기에 부적절하므로 보호자의 시청지도가 필요한 프로그램입니다, I peu-ro-geu-raem eun "X: se-mi-man ui eo rin-i/cheong-so nyeon-i si cheong hagi e bu-jeok jeol ha-meu robo hoja ui si cheong-ji doga pir-yo han peu-ro-geu-raem ipnida) for 7, 12, and 15 ratings. "All" and "19" ratings have a different disclaimer, which say "This program is suitable for all ages"(이 프로그램은 모든 연령의 시청자가 시청할 수 있는 프로그램입니다) and "This program is prohibited for children under the age of 19"(이 프로그램은 19세 미만의 청소년이 시청하기에 부적절한 프로그램입니다) respectively.

These ratings are used by all South Korean television broadcasters. Despite being intended for viewing within the country, KBS World also uses these ratings.

South Korean television ratings do not include content descriptors or advisories as they do in other nations. The ratings are therefore used in a broader sense.

Censorship
From 2004 to some time before 2013, the KCSC has required Korean citizens to enter government issued ID numbers in order to post political comments online.

During the presidency of Lee Myung-bak the KCSC was criticized for a perceived heavy bias in favor of the Lee Myung-bak government. On August 3, 2008, KCSC requested the internet portal, Daum, to delete posts and comments negative towards Lee Myung-bak during the heyday of the anti-beef imports.

Some lay members of the National Assembly protested against KCSC's censorship-like decision to monitor content in social network services and mobile applications.

Moon Yong-sik (문용식) CEO of the South Korean internet contents company, Nowcom, has expressed concerns about the KCSC becoming a tool to monitor and to censor online content that expresses anti-government and anti-big business messages.

The KCSC had considered penalizing SBS and MBC for showing Twitter messages that are critical against President Lee and his government.

SNS
The KCSC planned to set up a regulatory office dedicated to supervising posts on SNS outlets. However, the Constitutional Court of Korea ruled against KCSC's decision to regulate voting-related posts on SNS outlets.

Criticism
Fans of South Korea's popular variety show, Infinite Challenge criticized the KCSC for pointing out negative remarks towards the show regarding its usage of words based on outdated standards.

See also 
 Censorship in South Korea
 Korea Communications Commission

References

External links 
 http://www.kocsc.or.kr/eng/01_About/Message.php
  중국이나 한국이나…SNS 감시 ‘닮은꼴’, similarities between South Korea and China's approach on internet censorship

Internet censorship in South Korea
Government agencies of South Korea
2008 establishments in South Korea